Foxtel Arts was a subscription television arts channel available in Australia on the Foxtel platform.

History
Foxtel Arts replaced the SBS owned arts channel Studio, and became the third iteration of a dedicated arts channel on Foxtel in six years. The Foxtel owned and operated channel launched at 10am AEST on 28 March 2015. Part of the reason for launching the channel was to give Foxtel the ability to pitch programming to viewers aged over 55, a demographic the service began to pursue in 2014. In addition, the launch came at a time when Foxtel sought to bring more channels 'in-house' in order to obtain more exclusive content deals to increase their competitiveness with new streaming services such as Netflix and Stan.

From 11 October 2017, Foxtel Arts became a part-day channel, and was only broadcast between 6pm and midnight. This was due to a move by Foxtel to enable Foxtel Arts to share the same broadcast bandwidth as Foxtel Smooth, which was in turn only available between midnight and 6pm. It was then reverted to a 24-hour channel on 1 July 2020, following Foxtel Smooth's closure.

On September 1, 2021, the channel was closed down and replaced by FOX Docos on channel 129 on both Foxtel and the streaming service BINGE.

Programming
The channel's first local commission was the film and television review program Screen, hosted by Margaret Pomeranz and Graeme Blundell, which premiered on 2 April 2015. Past episodes are uploaded to YouTube.

Regular programming included programming featuring or related to opera, ballet, music, theatre, dance, classical and contemporary performance, as well as documentary specials and series from cinema, literature, visual art and artists.

References

External links
 

2015 establishments in Australia
2021 disestablishments in Australia
English-language television stations in Australia
Television networks in Australia
Defunct television channels in Australia
Television channels and stations established in 2015
Television channels and stations disestablished in 2021
Foxtel